Harry Gingell (24 May 1916 – 17 January 1993) was  a former Australian rules footballer who played with Footscray in the Victorian Football League (VFL).

Notes

External links 
		

1916 births
1993 deaths
Australian rules footballers from Victoria (Australia)
Western Bulldogs players